The 1992 Winnipeg Blue Bombers finished in 1st place in the East Division with an 11–7 record. They appeared in the Grey Cup but lost to the Calgary Stampeders.

Offseason

CFL Draft

Preseason

Regular season

Season standings

Season schedule

Playoffs

East Final

Grey Cup

Awards and records
CFL's Most Outstanding Rookie Award – Mike Richardson (RB)

1992 CFL All-Stars
RB – Mike Richardson, CFL All-Star
K – Troy Westwood, CFL All-Star

References

Winnipeg Blue Bombers seasons
James S. Dixon Trophy championship seasons
Winnl
Winnipeg Blue Bombers